Artyom Zemchyonok (born June 24, 1991) is a Russian professional ice hockey defenceman. He is currently playing with Metallurg Magnitogorsk of the Kontinental Hockey League (KHL).

Playing career
Zemchyonok made his Kontinental Hockey League debut playing with HC Spartak Moscow during the 2011–12 season.

After concluding the 2017–18 season, his 5th with Admiral Vladivostok, Zemchyonok left as a free agent to sign a one-year contract with perennial contenders, SKA Saint Petersburg, on 4 July 2018.

Zemchyonok played two seasons with SKA, before leaving as a free agent to sign a one-year contract with his fourth KHL club, Metallurg Magnitogorsk, on 4 May 2020.

References

External links

1991 births
Living people
Admiral Vladivostok players
Metallurg Magnitogorsk players
HC Spartak Moscow players
Russian ice hockey defencemen
Ice hockey people from Moscow
SKA Saint Petersburg players